Stoke Junction Halt (TQ 843 756  ) was a halt on the Hundred of Hoo Railway between Middle Stoke Halt and Grain Crossing Halt, it was also at the junction of the line to Allhallows-on-Sea. It was opened on 17 July 1932 and closed on 4 December 1961.

References

Sources.

External links
 Subterranea Britannica
 Stoke Junction Halt station on navigable 1940 O. S. map

Disused railway stations in Kent
Former Southern Railway (UK) stations
Railway stations in Great Britain opened in 1932
Railway stations in Great Britain closed in 1961
Transport in Medway